Nick Young may refer to:
 Nick Young (basketball) (born 1985), American basketball player
 Nick Young (broadcast journalist) (born 1948), American broadcast journalist
 Nick Young (charity executive)  (born 1952), chief executive of the British Red Cross
 Nick Young (character), fictional male lead of the Crazy Rich Asians novel and film franchise

See also
Nicholas Young (disambiguation)
Nick Youngs (born 1959), English rugby union player
Nick Youngquest (born 1983), Australian model and rugby league footballer